The Bates Nunataks are a set of three isolated nunataks (glacial islands) in the névé of Byrd Glacier,  west of Vantage Hill in the Britannia Range, that were discovered by the Darwin Glacier Party of the Commonwealth Trans-Antarctic Expedition (1956–58). They were named by the New Zealand Antarctic Place-Names Committee for J. Bates, a member of the Commonwealth Trans-Antarctic Expedition who accompanied Sir Edmund Hillary to the South Pole.

References 

Nunataks of George V Land